Rain Lee Choi-wah (born 11 November 1983) is a Hong Kong actress and singer.

Filmography
 Stolen Love (2001)
 Goodbye Mr Cool (2001)
 2002 (2001)
 If U Care ... (2002)
 My Lucky Star (2003)
 Super Model (2004)
 Love on the Rocks (2004)
 Kung Fu Soccer (2004)
 Astonishing (2004)
 Re-Cycle (2006)
 On the Edge (2006)
 Bet To Basic (2006)
 Single Blog (2007)
 House of Mahjong (2007)
 Forest of Death (2007)
 The Land With No Boundary (2011)
 Princess Show (2013)
 The Match (2016)
 Prehistoric War (2018)
 Prison Flowers (2019)

TV series
 Feel 100% (2002)
 Dream of Colours (2004)
 Wong Fei Hung – Master of Kung Fu (2005)
 Wing Chun (2006)
 Flaming Butterfly (2008)
 The Temptation to Go Home (2011)
 Modern Dynasty (2022)

References

External links
 
 Hong Kong Cinemagic entry

1983 births
Living people
Hong Kong film actresses
Hong Kong television actresses
21st-century Hong Kong women singers